Ryszard Ostrowski (born 6 February 1961) is a retired Polish middle distance runner who specialized in the 800 metres.

He was born in Poznań, and represented the club Olimpia Poznań. He won the 800 metres at the 1983 Summer Universiade and the 1985 Summer Universiade. In 1984 he tied for the victory, together with Alberto Juantorena, at the Friendship Games.

He finished fifth at the 1986 European Championships, fourth at the 1986 Goodwill Games, and the 1987 World Championships. At the 1988 Summer Olympics he reached the quarter-finals of the 800 metres. He competed at the 1990 European Championships without reaching the final. He became Polish champion in 1982, 1983, 1984 and 1987, and became Polish indoor champion in 1991 and 1994.

His personal best time was 1:44.38 minutes, achieved in September 1985 in Kobe.

His son, Artur, is also a middle distance runner.

Competitions record

References

1961 births
Living people
Polish male middle-distance runners
Polish athletics coaches
Athletes (track and field) at the 1988 Summer Olympics
Olympic athletes of Poland
Sportspeople from Poznań
World Athletics Championships athletes for Poland
Universiade medalists in athletics (track and field)
Universiade gold medalists for Poland
Medalists at the 1983 Summer Universiade
Competitors at the 1986 Goodwill Games
Friendship Games medalists in athletics
20th-century Polish people